Maynard Dixon (January 24, 1875 – November 11, 1946) was an American artist. He was known for his paintings, and his body of work focused on the American West. Dixon is considered one of the finest artists having dedicated most of their art on the U.S. Southwestern cultures and landscapes at the end of the 19th-century and the first half of the 20th-century. 

Through his work with the Galerie Beaux Arts, a cooperative gallery in San Francisco, Dixon played a pivotal role insuring the West Coast supported the work of local, modern artists. He was married for a time to photographer Dorothea Lange, and later to painter Edith Hamlin.

Early life and education
He was born Lafayette Maynard Dixon in Fresno, California, named after his maternal grandfather. His family of aristocratic Virginia Confederates had found a new home in California after the American Civil War. His mother, Constance Maynard, a well-educated daughter of a Navy officer from San Francisco, shared her love of classic literature with the young boy and encouraged him in his writing and drawing. His brother  was a metalsmith.

Dixon moved to San Francisco in 1893 and studied with Arthur Mathews at the California School of Design (now San Francisco Art Institute). There he became a friend of Tonalist painter Xavier Martinez, with whom he traveled to Monterey, Carmel, and Point Lobos.

Career 
In 1900 Dixon visited Arizona and Mexico, later accompanied artist Edward Borein on a horseback trip through several western states. Also he arranged for the debut exhibition of the soon-to-be-famous sculptor Arthur Putnam in the “jinks room” of the San Francisco Press Club. Dixon's sketching trip through Arizona and Guadalajara in March and April 1905 with Martinez garnered much attention in the press. Dixon moved into Martinez's Montgomery Street atelier; their joint studio exhibitions were usually held on Saturdays. To insure a steady income, he worked as an illustrator for local newspapers and magazines (including the Overland Monthly and Sunset magazine), and illustrated numerous books, such as Clarence E. Mulford’s Hopalong Cassidy.

For his first exhibition in the southwest, Dixon contributed four oils to the show of Modern Art From The American West curated by the well-known impressionist Jennie V. Cannon at the University of Arizona in Tucson in December of 1912.

In 1917, to support America’s entry into World War I, Dixon joined Lee F. Randolph, Bruce Nelson, and other artists on a committee to redesign U.S. Army camouflage.

During his tenure in northern California, he was a prolific contributor to art exhibitions. His first publicized exhibition was a show of “regional artists” in Alameda, California during the spring of 1899. Thereafter he exhibited at major venue: California Society of Artists (1902); Bohemian Club (1903–1928); San Francisco Art Association (1903–1931); Newspaper Artists League (1903); Press Club (1904); Hotel Del Monte Art Gallery (1907–1909); Panama–Pacific International Exposition (1915); Gump's Gallery (1920 – solo exhibition); San Francisco Print Rooms (1920 – this show was later sent to Honolulu); San Francisco's Don Lee Galleries (1923); Oakland Art Gallery (1926–1928); University of California, Berkeley (1928); California State Fair (1928); and Golden Gate International Exposition (1939).

Between 1925 and 1933, art dealer Beatrice Judd Ryan ran the Galerie Beaux Arts in San Francisco, with guidance from Dixon. The Galerie Beaux Arts was the first contemporary gallery in the city, as well as a cooperative nonprofit, which supported local modern artists.

In 1926, Dixon was co-curator with Laura Adams Armer for an exhibit of “Pueblo and Navajo Arts & Crafts” at the Paul Elder Gallery of San Francisco under the auspices of the Indian Defense Association of Central and Northern California. In 1927 he joined several prominent artists in a boycott of the Bohemian Club Annual Exhibition when works of the more “modern” artists were excluded. During February 1930 he was one of a handful of artists, which included Ralph Stackpole, Otis Oldfield, Helen Katharine Forbes, and several others, who contributed to a Galerie Beaux Arts show where the subject of every painting was the same female model. During the summer of 1931 he exhibited with the most prominent artists of the west, including William Ritschel, Armin Hansen, Granville Redmond, and Leland Curtis, at the Tahoe Tavern on Lake Tahoe. Between 1935 and 1943 he was a member of the Society of the Thirteen Watercolorists that exhibited at the: San Francisco Museum of Art, California Palace of the Legion of Honor (museum), Stanford University Art Gallery; and the de Young Museum.

For a time, he lived in New York with his young wife and baby daughter Constance, but soon returned to the western United States where he said he could create "honest art of the west" instead of the romanticized versions he was being paid to create. Shortly after he began a new life in San Francisco, his first marriage ended.

Dixon developed his style during this period, and western themes became a trademark for him. In San Francisco, Dixon was considered a colorful character with a good sense of humor. He often dressed like a cowboy and seemed determined to impart a western style, most often in the form of a black Stetson hat, boots, and a bola tie.

Influenced in part by the Panama Pacific International Exposition of 1915, Dixon began to search for a new expression, moving away from impressionism and into a simpler, more modern style. Meeting and marrying Dorothea Lange, a portrait photographer from the east, had a great influence on his art. They married in 1920 and by 1925, the year their first son Daniel Rhodes Dixon was born (15 May), Maynard's style had changed dramatically to even more powerful compositions, with the emphasis on design, color, and self-expression. A true modernist emerged. The power of low horizons and marching cloud formations, simplified, and distilled, became his own brand and at once were both bold and mysterious. On 12 June 1928, his second son was born, John Eaglefeather Dixon.

During the Great Depression, Dixon painted a series of social realism canvases depicting the prevailing politics of maritime strikes, displaced workers, and those affected by the depression. Simultaneously, Lange captured on film images of the migrant workers in the Salinas Valley and the city breadlines, images that eventually brought her fame. In 1933 the Dixons spent the summer in Zion National Park with sojourns to the hamlet of Mount Carmel, Utah. Lange was called back to San Francisco, a separation that led to the couple's divorce in 1935.

Two years later, Dixon married San Francisco muralist Edith Hamlin. The couple left San Francisco two years later for southern Utah, the source of some of Dixon's greatest art. In 1939, the couple built a summer home in Mount Carmel, where Dixon found new friends and became reacquainted with the local natural landscapes. He lived near the cottonwood trees along an old irrigation ditch and took short hikes to a plateau where he loved the quiet. Dixon spent winter months in Tucson, where the couple also had a home and studio.

Dixon continued to create simple but powerful compositions in which non-essential elements were distilled or eliminated. In 1946, Maynard died at his home in Tucson. In the spring of 1947, his widow Edith brought his ashes to Mount Carmel where she buried them on a high bluff above the art studio being built on the property. This had been at his request and she felt it a fitting tribute where friends could come to pay respects and view the land that he loved.

In addition to painting, he also wrote poetry. An article in the California Historical Quarterly described his poetry as "very competent and sometimes superb".

Legacy
The largest collection of Dixon's works is at Brigham Young University, at the Museum of Art.

There are two museums devoted to Dixon and his works. The Maynard and Edith Hamlin Dixon House and Studio, operated by the Thunderbird Foundation, offers guided tours at Mount Carmel, Utah. The foundation is working to establish a separate museum and regional art center that would feature works by Maynard Dixon and his circle, Milford Zornes and his circle, as well as contemporary work by local artists. 

There is a Maynard Dixon Museum inside the Mark Sublette Medicine Man Gallery in Tucson, Arizona. Works by Dixon include paintings, watercolors, pastels, drawings, poetry, and illustrations.

The full length documentary film, "Maynard Dixon: Art and Spirit" (2007) was directed by Jayne McKay, and includes candid commentary from their children and extended family. The television program, "Maynard Dixon: To the Desert Again" (2007), was produced by KUED-TV.

Exhibitions
 “Maynard Dixon: Searching for a Home”, Provo, Utah, Brigham Young University Museum of Art, Oct 2022 – Sept 2023 Maynard Dixon: Searching for a Home
 "Maynard Dixon's American West," Western Spirit: Scottsdale Museum of the West, Oct 2019 – July 2020
 "Along the Distant Mesa: An Homage to Maynard Dixon", Medicine Man Gallery, Tucson, Arizona, March–April 2019
 "Maynard Dixon’s New Mexico Centennial", El Museo Cultural – Objects of Art,  Santa Fe, New Mexico. August 2018
 "Maynard Dixon: The Paltenghi Collections". Nevada Museum of Art, Reno, Nevada. January to July 2017
 "Maynard Dixon: Beyond the Clouds". Western Museum, Wickenburg, Arizona. December 2016 – March 2017
 "Widening the Horizon: New Mexico Landscapes". Matthews Gallery, Santa Fe, New Mexico. June 13–30, 2015
 "Maynard Dixon – Masterpieces from Brigham Young University & Private Collections". Pacific Museum of California Art, Pasadena, California, June–August 2007.
 "Maynard Dixon". University of Arizona, Tucson, Arizona. January to April 2005
 "Escape to Reality": The Western World of Maynard Dixon". Brigham Young University, Provo, Utah. November 2000 – November 2001
 "Maynard Dixon". University of California Berkeley Art Museum – MATRIX, Berkeley, California. December 15, 1981 – March 7, 1982
 "Maynard Dixon – Images of the Native American". California Academy of Sciences, San Francisco, California. June–October 1981

See also 

 Fernand Lungren

References

Further reading
 Sublette, J. Mark: "Maynard Dixon's American West: Along the Distant Mesa" (2019). Medecine Man Gallery, Santa Fe. 
 
 Wesley Jessup, Donald J. Hagerty, Jayne McKay: "Maynard Dixon – Masterpieces from Brigham Young University & Private Collections" (2007). Pacific Museum of California Art, Pasadena, California. 
 Gibbs, Linda Jones: "Escape to Reality: The Western World of Maynard Dixon" (2001). Brigham Young University, Creative Works. 
 Sublette, J. Mark, and Hagerty, Donald J.: "Mesas, Mountains, & Man: The Western Vision of Maynard Dixon" (1998). Medicine Man Gallery Publishing, Santa Fe, New Mexico.
 Lange, Dorothea (1994): Thunderbird Remembered: Maynard Dixon, the Man and the Artist. University of Washington Press.

External links

 Guide to the Maynard Dixon Papers at The Bancroft Library
 
 Grace Carpenter Hudson/Maynard Dixon correspondence and memorabilia, 1907-1931. California State Library, California History Room.
 Maynard Dixon Gallery of Art
 Maynard Dixon Museum, Tucson, Arizona
 
 
 Thunderbird Foundation for the Arts a nonprofit organization furthering the legacy of American artist Maynard Dixon by preserving his estate and educating the public about his immeasurable contributions to American art. The Thunderbird Foundation also maintains the Maynard Dixon summer home and studio in Mt. Carmel, Utah.
 Maynard Dixon Country, annual art show
 Maynard Dixon (2007) documentary produced by KUED

Artists of the American West
19th-century American painters
American male painters
20th-century American painters
American muralists
Social realist artists
1875 births
1946 deaths
People from Fresno, California
Painters from California
Section of Painting and Sculpture artists
19th-century American male artists
20th-century American male artists